In mathematics, a natural number a is a unitary divisor (or Hall divisor) of a number b if a is a divisor of b and if a and  are coprime, having no common factor other than 1. Thus, 5 is a unitary divisor of 60, because 5 and  have only 1 as a common factor, while 6 is a divisor but not a unitary divisor of 60, as 6 and  have a common factor other than 1, namely 2. 1 is a unitary divisor of every natural number.

Equivalently, a divisor a of b is a unitary divisor if and only if every prime factor of a has the same multiplicity in a as it has in b.

The sum-of-unitary-divisors function is denoted by the lowercase Greek letter sigma thus: σ*(n). The sum of the k-th powers of the unitary divisors is denoted by σ*k(n):

If the proper unitary divisors of a given number add up to that number, then that number is called a unitary perfect number. 

The concept of a unitary divisor originates from R. Vaidyanathaswamy (1931) [The theory of multiplicative arithmetic functions. Transactions of the American Mathematical Society, 33(2), 579--662] who used the term block divisor.

Properties
The number of unitary divisors of a number n is 2k, where k is the number of distinct prime factors of n. 

This is because each integer N > 1 is the product of positive powers prp of distinct prime numbers p. Thus every unitary divisor of N is the product, over a given subset S of the prime divisors {p} of N,
of the prime powers prp for p ∈ S. If there are k prime factors, then there are exactly 2k subsets S, and the statement follows.

The sum of the unitary divisors of n is odd if n is a power of 2 (including 1), and even otherwise.

Both the count and the sum of the unitary divisors of n are multiplicative functions of n that are not completely multiplicative. The Dirichlet generating function is

Every divisor of n is unitary if and only if n is square-free.

Odd unitary divisors 
The sum of the k-th powers of the odd unitary divisors is

It is also multiplicative, with Dirichlet generating function

Bi-unitary divisors
A divisor d of n is a bi-unitary divisor if the greatest common unitary divisor of d and n/d is 1.  This concept originates from D. Suryanarayana (1972). [The number of bi-unitary divisors of an integer, in The Theory of Arithmetic Functions, Lecture Notes in Mathematics 251: 273–282, New York, Springer–Verlag].

The number of bi-unitary divisors of n is a multiplicative function of n with average order  where

A bi-unitary perfect number is one equal to the sum of its bi-unitary aliquot divisors.  The only such numbers are 6, 60 and 90.

OEIS sequences

References

   Section B3.
 
 
 
 
 
 
 
 
  Section 4.2

External links 
 
 Mathoverflow | Boolean ring of unitary divisors

Number theory